Joshua Thomas McDaniels (born April 22, 1976) is an American football coach who is the head coach for the Las Vegas Raiders of the National Football League (NFL). He began his NFL career in 2001 with the New England Patriots, where he served as the offensive coordinator for 14 non-consecutive seasons. During McDaniels' first stint as offensive coordinator from 2006 to 2008, New England set the season record for points scored and became the first team to win all 16 regular season games in 2007. In his second stint from 2012 to 2021, the Patriots won three Super Bowl titles in Super Bowl XLIX, Super Bowl LI, and Super Bowl LIII. McDaniels was also among the Patriots personnel to be present for all six of their titles during the Brady–Belichick era.

In between his Patriots tenure, McDaniels served as the head coach of the Denver Broncos from 2009 to 2010. He left New England a second time in 2022 to become the head coach of the Raiders.

Playing career
Recruited out of Canton McKinley High School by Greg Debeljak, McDaniels attended John Carroll University, where he played football primarily as a wide receiver from 1995 to 1998. Though a quarterback in high school, he lost out at that position at John Carroll to Nick Caserio, who joined the Patriots staff in 2001 (the same year as McDaniels). His other teammates at John Carroll included London Fletcher, formerly a linebacker with the St. Louis Rams, Buffalo Bills, and Washington Redskins; as well as Brian Polian, the former head coach at the University of Nevada-Reno; Jerry Schuplinski, the New York Giants quarterbacks coach; Tom Telesco, general manager of the Los Angeles Chargers; and Dave Ziegler, general manager of the Las Vegas Raiders.

Coaching career

Michigan State
McDaniels began his coaching career as a senior graduate assistant at Michigan State University in 1999 under Nick Saban, parlaying his dad's friendship with Saban. After assisting Michigan State, McDaniels moved to Cleveland and worked as a plastics sales representative.

New England Patriots
McDaniels joined the Patriots in 2001 as a personnel assistant. From 2002 to 2003, he served as a defensive coaching assistant for the team, working with the defensive backs in 2003. In 2004, he became the team's quarterbacks coach. In McDaniels's first four seasons with the team, the Patriots won three Super Bowls: Super Bowl XXXVI, Super Bowl XXXVIII, and Super Bowl XXXIX. After offensive coordinator Charlie Weis left the team following the 2004 season, the Patriots did not name an offensive coordinator for the 2005 season. According to The New York Times, in 2008, it was McDaniels who called the offensive plays for the 2005 season, although suggestions to that effect were made in 2005. After the season, McDaniels was officially promoted to offensive coordinator, while retaining his responsibilities coaching the team's quarterbacks.

In the 2007 season, with McDaniels at the helm of the offense, the Patriots set NFL records, scoring 75 touchdowns (67 on offense, 50 passing and 17 rushing) and 589 points, leading to rumors that McDaniels might leave the Patriots for a head coaching job. McDaniels withdrew his name from consideration, however, during the Patriots' January 2008 playoff run. Shortly after the Patriots' loss in Super Bowl XLII, Patriots head coach Bill Belichick gave McDaniels a five-page typed report on what it takes to be an effective head coach and run a winning organization, which McDaniels termed "his bible." Throughout the 2008 season, the two would meet to discuss the report and allow McDaniels to ask non-coaching questions that he brought to later head coaching interviews.

Starting quarterback Tom Brady suffered a season-ending injury in Week 1 of the 2008 season. McDaniels directed the Matt Cassel-led Patriots' offense as the team finished the season with an 11–5 record.

Denver Broncos

On January 11, 2009, the Denver Broncos named McDaniels their head coach, replacing Mike Shanahan. The Broncos introduced McDaniels, who agreed to sign a four-year, $8 million contract, as their head coach in a press conference the next day.

McDaniels's tenure with the Broncos was marred early on by a controversy involving an alleged trade offer from the Patriots involving the team's quarterback, Jay Cutler, which would have sent Matt Cassel to Denver. On March 9, 2009, according to ESPN, a conference call involving McDaniels, team owner Pat Bowlen and Cutler failed to resolve the issues. Cutler said he did not trust McDaniels and the organization following the trade controversy. On April 2, 2009, the Broncos traded Cutler and a 2009 fifth-round draft pick to the Chicago Bears for quarterback Kyle Orton, first- and third-round picks in 2009 and a first-round pick in 2010.

2009 season

The Broncos started their first season under McDaniels with six straight wins, including an overtime win over the Patriots in Week 5, before suffering four straight losses. In the last game of the season, McDaniels and the Broncos still had a potential playoff berth on the line, but lost to the Kansas City Chiefs, 44–24, Denver's third straight home loss to a division opponent. That left the Broncos with an 8–8 season record. Controversy surrounded McDaniels for his benching of Pro Bowl wide receiver Brandon Marshall for the game due to disciplinary reasons; Marshall would be traded to the Miami Dolphins after the season.

2010 season

McDaniels' second season in Denver ended with a 3–9 record. The Broncos lost to the Kansas City Chiefs on December 5, and on the next day, McDaniels was fired by the Broncos.

Videotaping scandal

On November 27, The Denver Post reported the Broncos were under investigation from the NFL, after it was reported that Steve Scarnecchia, the team's director of video operations hired by McDaniels in 2009, videotaped a San Francisco 49ers' walkthrough practice, during the teams' Week 8 game at Wembley Stadium in London, England.

The same day, the NFL fined the Broncos and McDaniels $50,000 each, and Scarnecchia was fired as a result of the incident. Scarnecchia told NFL investigators he acted alone and "knew it was wrong" to tape the walkthrough practice, after the rest of the Broncos' staff had left the stadium. Scarnecchia later presented McDaniels with the six-minute video, but McDaniels declined to view it, and it was not shown to any other Broncos staff member, and therefore the NFL determined the Broncos had not gained a competitive advantage from it. An anonymous source alerted the Broncos on November 8, who conducted an internal investigation before alerting the NFL. NFL Security then began its investigation, which included a forensic analysis of the computer from which the recording was later deleted by Scarnecchia. Both the NFL and the Broncos determined that McDaniels knew nothing about the incident.

However, the NFL fined McDaniels due to the fact that he did not immediately report the incident to the league office, as required by policy. The NFL also fined the Broncos, as "clubs are ultimately accountable for the conduct of their employees."

McDaniels later issued the following statement:

"I apologize for not promptly reporting the improper conduct of our video director before our game against the 49ers in London. The actions of this individual are in no way representative of the values and integrity held by myself, our players and coaches, and the entire Denver Broncos organization. I understand the punishment from the National Football League and support its commitment to the integrity of the game. We have addressed the situation internally to assure that nothing like this happens again."

According to The Denver Post, the videotaping incident was a major factor in McDaniels' firing a week later; while the Broncos did not deem it something that merited being fired for cause, they considered his failure to report the incident "unforgivable."

St. Louis Rams
On January 18, 2011, McDaniels agreed to become the offensive coordinator for the St. Louis Rams under head coach Steve Spagnuolo. In Super Bowl XLII, Spagnuolo was the defensive coordinator of the New York Giants, while McDaniels was the offensive coordinator of the Patriots. Spagnuolo stated, "I've always recognized that he is one of the top offensive minds in the NFL. We think he is a great addition to our organization." Also, during the same news conference, it was announced McDaniels would have no hand in any personnel decisions.

Return to New England
Following the 2011 season, the Rams fired Spagnuolo as head coach. While McDaniels was under contract for the 2012 season, the Rams informed him that they would not hold him to his contract, and would allow him to leave. The Patriots then hired McDaniels to act as an offensive assistant coach during their 2011 playoffs, and to replace Bill O'Brien as offensive coordinator/quarterbacks coach for the 2012 season. O'Brien left the Patriots after the 2011 season concluded to become head coach at Penn State, but maintained playcalling duties through Super Bowl XLVI.

During the 2014 season, McDaniels was a part of another championship for the Patriots, winning Super Bowl XLIX against the Seattle Seahawks despite a 10-point deficit in the fourth quarter. During the 2016 season, McDaniels coached the offense in another Patriots championship season, this time winning Super Bowl LI against the Atlanta Falcons. In the game, the Patriots defeated the Falcons by a score of 34–28 in overtime, this time coming from a 25-point deficit. The Patriots scored only 9 points in the first 3 quarters, but overcame a 3 possession deficit to tie the game in the last minute and win in overtime.

2 days after Super Bowl LII, on February 6, 2018, McDaniels was announced as the new head coach of the Indianapolis Colts. However, McDaniels withdrew from the position on the same day and announced that he had decided to stay with the Patriots. In response, his long-time agent, Bob LaMonte, terminated his representation of McDaniels. The Patriots went on to win Super Bowl LIII in 2018, earning McDaniels his third championship as offensive coordinator.

Las Vegas Raiders
On January 31, 2022, McDaniels was hired as the head coach of the Las Vegas Raiders. McDaniels got his first win with the Raiders when the Raiders beat McDaniels' former team, the Denver Broncos 32-23.

Head coaching record

Personal life
McDaniels is the son of Thom McDaniels (the 1997 USA Today High School Coach of the Year and often described as a "legend" of Ohio high school football). Attending his father's practices during his youth has been credited with inspiring McDaniels to enter coaching. Josh is also the brother of Ben McDaniels who currently coaches with the Houston Texans.

Josh and his wife, Laura, have four children.

References

External links

 Las Vegas Raiders profile

1976 births
Living people
American football wide receivers
Coaches of American football from Ohio
Denver Broncos coaches
Denver Broncos head coaches
John Carroll Blue Streaks football players
Las Vegas Raiders coaches
Las Vegas Raiders head coaches
Michigan State Spartans football coaches
National Football League offensive coordinators
New England Patriots coaches
People from Barberton, Ohio
Players of American football from Canton, Ohio
Sportspeople from Canton, Ohio
St. Louis Rams coaches